The Rhine was a 1,691 ton iron sailing ship with a length of , breadth of  and depth of . She was built by Russel & Company, Port Glasgow for the Nourse Line, named after the river Rhine which starts in Switzerland and flows via Germany and the Netherlands to the North Sea, and launched on 10 December 1885. She was primarily used for the transportation of Indian indentured labourers to the colonies. Details of some of these voyages are as follows:

The Rhine was sold by the Nourse Line in 1907 and passed through a number of owners. It was initially sold to R.C. Williams of New Brunswick, Canada, then in 1909 it was sold to W.H. Chandler, who operated the ship as Rhine Shipping Company, Montreal, Canada. In 1911 the Rhine Shipping Company was sold to G.I. Dewar of Montreal, Canada, then in 1915 it was sold to new owners in Boston, then was sold once more to W. McKissock of Boston and finally in 1923 was sold to E.P. Reiss of Boston for use as a barge.

See also 
 Indian Indenture Ships to Fiji
 Indian indenture system

References

External links 
 Indian Immigrant Ship List
 Genealogy.com

Indian indentureship in Trinidad and Tobago
History of Suriname
Indian indenture ships to Fiji
Individual sailing vessels
Victorian-era passenger ships of the United Kingdom
Merchant ships of the United States
Ships built on the River Clyde
Barges
1885 ships